The 2006–07 Palau Soccer League was the fourth season of association football competition in Palau and the first to straddle two calendar years. The league was won by Team Bangladesh, their second title.

Teams 
Five teams will compete in the 2006–07 season of the Palau Soccer League. All matches will played at the PCC Track & Field Stadium in Koror, home stadium to all the teams. This is due to the lack of suitable venues for soccer matches in Palau. The teams for 2006–07 (listed in alphabetical order) are:
 Mount Everest Nepal FC
 Palau Tiger Team FC
 Surangel and Sons Company FC
 Team Bangladesh FC
 Universal Peace Foundation FC

The location of the PCC Track & Field Stadium, where all games will take place:

League stage

Standings

Result table 
The league consisted of home and away games, from which the top two teams qualified for a one-legged semi final to determine who would play for the championship. The losers of the semi-finals would enter the third-place playoff.

Knockout stage

Semi-finals 
Both semi finals were played on 28 February 2007.

Third-place match

Final

Top scorers

References 

Palau Soccer League seasons
Palau
Soccer
Palau
Soccer